Zhang Zhipeng (born May 14, 1982, in Harbin, China) is a Chinese male curler and curling coach.

He started to play curling in 2000.

Teams and events

Men's

Mixed doubles

Record as a coach of national teams

References

External links
 

1982 births
People from Harbin
Living people
Chinese male curlers
Chinese curling coaches
Pacific-Asian curling champions
Competitors at the 2007 Winter Universiade